This is a season-by-season list of records compiled by Harvard in men's ice hockey.

Harvard University has won one NCAA Championship in its history and is one of the oldest programs in the world, having played ice hockey since the late 19th century and suspended three seasons only due to World Wars.

Season-by-season results

Note: GP = Games played, W = Wins, L = Losses, T = Ties

* Winning percentage is used when conference schedules are unbalanced.

Footnotes

References

 
Lists of college men's ice hockey seasons in the United States
Harvard Crimson ice hockey seasons